Trichopilia laxa is a species of orchid found from western South America to Venezuela.

laxa